The industrial complex is a socioeconomic concept wherein businesses become entwined in social or political systems or institutions, creating or bolstering a profit economy from these systems. Such a complex is said to pursue its own financial interests regardless of, and often at the expense of, the best interests of society and individuals. Businesses within an industrial complex may have been created to advance a social or political goal, but mostly profit when the goal is not reached. The industrial complex may profit financially from maintaining socially detrimental or inefficient systems.

History 

The concept was popularized by President Dwight Eisenhower  in his Jan. 17, 1961 farewell speech. Eisenhower described a "threat to democratic government" called the military–industrial complex. This complex involved the military establishment gaining "unwarranted influence" over the economic, political, and spiritual realms of American society due to the profitability of the US arms industry and the number of citizens employed in various branches of military service, the armaments industry, and other businesses providing goods to the US army. The "complex" arises from the creation of a multilateral economy serving military goals, as well as the paradox that arises from the goal of the multilateralism (sustained profit) as antithetical to the military's theoretical goal (peace).

Operations 
In many cases, the industrial complex refers to a conflict of interest between an institution's purported socio-political purpose and the financial interests of the businesses and government agencies that profit from the pursuit of such purpose, when achieving the stated purpose would result in a financial loss for those businesses. For example, the purported purpose of the US penal system is to assist offenders in becoming law abiding citizens yet the prison–industrial complex subsists upon high inmate populations, thus relying on the penal system's failure to meet its goal of criminal reform and re-entry. In these types of cases, government agencies are often thought to profit financially from institutional industrialization, perhaps eroding their motivation to legislate such institutions in ways that may be socially beneficial.

The industrial complex concept has also been used informally to denote the artificial creation, inflation, or manipulation of an institution's societal value in order to increase profit opportunities, especially through specialty businesses and niche products. An example of this is the marriage industrial complex, where demand for wedding dress makers, wedding venues, wedding planners, wedding cake bakers, wedding rentals companies, wedding photographers, etc, is created by the perceived social necessity of an elaborate wedding ceremony.

Examples 
 Military–Industrial Complex — Businesses that supply the army with uniforms, artillery, etc, profit from the continuation of war and will be hurt by peace.
 Animal–Industrial Complex — Systematic and institutionalized exploitation of non-human animals, which requires breeding and killing animals in the billions in what has come to be known as the "animal holocaust", threatening human survival and resulting in environmental destruction such as climate change, ocean acidification, biodiversity loss, spread of zoonotic diseases, and the sixth mass extinction.
 Prison–Industrial Complex — Businesses access labor from prisoners that is cheaper than civilian labor, thus they profit from high incarceration rates.
 Medical–Industrial Complex — Hospitals and pharmaceutical companies require patients to be sick, thus business interests are at odds with the goal of making people healthy. Inflation of drug and hospital prices contribute to the rising expense of healthcare in the United States.
 Wedding/Marriage–Industrial Complex — Wedding-related businesses and vendors profit from the growing extravagance and cost of weddings and will be negatively impacted by smaller, cheaper events or elopements, thus they perpetuate the pressure on brides to have expensive weddings.
 (Hot) Take-Industrial Complex – Professional commentators need to express novel opinions (known as "hot takes") to differentiate themselves and capture audience attention, which leads to increasingly fringe ideas becoming the most prominent in the public discourse.

Applications 
The following have been considered examples of industrial complexes:

 Academic–industrial complex
 Animal–industrial complex
Athletic–industrial complex
 Baby or diaper–industrial complex
Border–industrial complex
 Celebrity–industrial complex
 Global–industrial complex
 Medical–industrial complex or medical–pharmacological industrial complex
 Military–industrial complex
Military-digital complex
Military-entertainment complex
Military–industrial–media complex
 Nonprofit–industrial complex or NGO–industrial complex
Peace–industrial complex
Pharmaceutical–industrial complex
Politico-media complex
Poverty industrial complex
 Prison–industrial complex or criminal (justice) industrial complex
 Religion–industrial complex
 Wedding–industrial complex and divorce–industrial complex

See also
Socioeconomics

References 

Socioeconomics
 
Pejorative terms